Nicholas Albert Giaquinto (born April 4, 1955) is a former American football running back in the National Football League (NFL) for the Miami Dolphins and the Washington Redskins, where head coach Joe Gibbs nicknamed him "The Trashman" for his ability to fill many roles on the team.  During the 1983 season, Giaquinto played as the first H-Back in NFL history.  He played in the 1982 and 1983 Super Bowls with the Redskins and retired after the 1983 season, ending his four-year NFL career.  He played college football at the University of Connecticut and the University of Bridgeport. He holds the single-game rushing record at UConn of 277 yards, set in a 1976 game against Holy Cross.  He attended Stratford High School in Stratford, Connecticut where he was an All-State and National High School All American selection in football.

Giaquinto was the head baseball coach at Sacred Heart University in Connecticut, a position he has held since prior to the 1989 season.  He has retired after the 2017 season, the last season for Sacred Heart at the Ballpark at Harbor Yard.

Head coaching records
The following is a list of Giaquinto's yearly records as an NCAA Division I head baseball coach.  Although Giaquinto has coached Sacred Heart since the start of the 1989 season, Sacred Heart did not join Division I until the start of the 2000 season.

References

External links
 2004 article, From the Super Bowl to Sacred Heart
 Sacred Heart Profile
 NFL Statistics
 
 1982 Redskins Statistics
 1983 Redskins Statistics
 UConn football records

1955 births
Living people
American football running backs
UConn Huskies football players
George Mason Patriots baseball coaches
George Mason University alumni 
Miami Dolphins players
Players of American football from Connecticut
Sportspeople from Bridgeport, Connecticut
Sacred Heart Pioneers baseball coaches
Washington Redskins players
Bridgeport Purple Knights football players